Marie-Françoise Guédon, Ph.D., is a Canadian anthropologist and professor of religious studies at the University of Ottawa in Ottawa, Canada.  She has done fieldwork among the Inuit, Gitksan, Ahtna, and Tanana peoples of Canada and Alaska.

Marie-Francois Guedon is the daughter of French Resistance fighters Robert Guedon and Reine Guedon. She was a student of the anthropologist Frederica de Laguna, with whom she later did fieldwork in Alaska in 1968.

Her 2005 book, Le rêve et la forêt: histoires de chamanes nabesna  (The Dream and the Forest), published by Laval University Press, was nominated for the 2006 Governor General's Award for French non-fiction.

She is also director of the Canadian Centre for Inter-Culture Research and Training and has written extensively on North American world views and shamanism.

Sources
 Mauzé, Marie, Michael E. Harkin, and Sergei Kan (eds.)  (2004) Coming to Shore: Northwest Coast Ethnology, Traditions, and Visions.   Lincoln: University of Nebraska Press.

External links

Canadian women anthropologists
Canadian non-fiction writers in French
Academic staff of the University of Ottawa
Year of birth missing (living people)
Living people
Canadian women non-fiction writers